Tropical Storm Hernan was a small and disorganized tropical cyclone that brought widespread flooding and destructive mudslides to several states in southwest Mexico in late August 2020. Hernan was the thirteenth tropical cyclone and eighth named storm of the 2020 Pacific hurricane season. A tropical storm formed from a low-pressure area that was located southwest of Mexico on August 26. Moving generally northward and paralleling the west coast of Mexico, the system was hindered by a high wind shear environment and barely strengthened. The cyclone achieved peak intensity around 6:00 UTC on August 27 with 45 mph (75 km/h) winds and a minimum barometric pressure of 1001 millibars (29.56 inHg). Passing just offshore the state of Jalisco, Hernan turned west and degenerated to a remnant low on August 28. The low moved near the Baja California Peninsula a couple hours later and dissipated shortly thereafter.
 
Multiple highways had to be shut down due to dangerous conditions, including mudslides and rivers overflowing their banks. Several schools suffered damage in the state of Colima, and in the city of Manzanillo, homes, businesses, and streets were damaged and covered in mud. Nearly 20,000 people were heavily impacted by Hernan in Jalisco, and 1,674 homes and nine schools suffered severe damage. In that state, a man fell off his roof and died while inspecting it for damage following the storm. An additional person was reported missing in Guerrero. Total damage in Mexico is unknown.

Meteorological history
 
On August 17, the National Hurricane Center (NHC) first noted the potential for an area of low pressure to form off the southwest coast of Mexico in the following days. At the time, Hurricane Genevieve was in the proximity of the predicted area of formation. After Genevieve moved away and dissipated, the surrounding monsoon trough became active in response, and the disturbance's formation chances gradually increased. Aided by a favorable pulse of the Madden-Julian Oscillation (MJO), a broad area of low pressure developed as forecast on August 20. Easterly wind shear and the disturbance's broad size inhibited its development initially; atmospheric convection began to increase on August 24.
 
The NHC noted at the time that the system was facing strong easterly wind shear and was slightly elongated from northeast to southwest, inhibiting potential strengthening. It was also located on the eastern side of a broad monsoon gyre, inducing an eastward-to-northward motion. Continuous wind shear caused Hernan to weaken, restricting convection to the southern and western confines of the storm's center. Moving around the northeastern periphery of the large cyclonic gyre, Hernan moved over the Gulf of California and turned west early on August 28. The system was downgraded to a tropical depression at 12:00 UTC that day as most of its convection dissipated. Hernan weakened into a remnant low six hours later. The remnants of Hernan continued westward around the gyre containing Tropical Storm Iselle, which was located to the south. By 00:00 UTC on August 29, the remnants were completely absorbed into this feature.

Impact

Hernan had a notable impact in multiple western Mexican states despite its small size. A total of 97,000 people lost electricity in the country due to the storm. Over 250 state and federal workers were dispatched to areas affected by Hernan while different agencies traveled by helicopter to bring food and supplies. Mexico's Secretariat of the Navy, José Rafael Ojeda Durán, implemented the Marine Plan, which carried out the evacuation of people trapped by flooding, removed debris, cleaned beaches, and transferred food and equipment to victims. Over 450 units of army machinery were used: 60 maritime units, 6 aircraft, and 391 land units. At least seven people were rescued by air following inundation of their houses by flood waters.

Jalisco
Jalisco and Colima were placed under the "high risk" category for floods and landslides due to expected rains of up to 8.8 cubic feet (250 liters) per square meter. Heavy rains from Hernan left 30 communities in Jalisco without power. 400 people were evacuated prior to Hernan's passing, while 18 people stuck on their roofs were rescued as well. Landslides and mudslides covered parts of Mexican federal highways 80 and 200 and were cleared by agency workers. In the towns of Melaque and La Manzanilla, Hernan left heavy flooding, and the nearby Cuixmala River overflowed. Mexico's federal highway 200 experienced mudslides and subsequent traffic cuts, while rising waters in the El Pedregal stream, in Cihuatlán, led to flooding that prompted the opening of three shelters in Jaluco and Melaque. Citizens in Melaque had to travel by boat to navigate severely flooded streets. Hundreds of houses across multiple municipalities in the state were reported from suffering extreme flooding: 400 in Hacienda de Cabañas, 100 in El Bejuco, and 100 in Petatlán, where 200 people required sheltering. Torrential rains and landslides afflicted the coast of Jalisco, affected the city of Puerto Vallarta, where the Ameca River flooded, and the San Sebastián del Oeste-Mascota highway was blocked off to hazardous conditions created by the weather. Landslides and floods isolated multiple communities in Jalisco, and 5 federal highways were closed between Jalisco and neighboring Colima and Nayarit.

It was reported that at least 19,968 people were impacted and in need of support in the state following Hernan. Over 350 people from Cihuatlán and Tomatlán, including 115 minors, were transferred to shelters. At least 630 houses and nine schools experienced severe damage throughout the state. The hard-hit municipality of Cihuatlán saw 250 homes damaged, while La Huerta experienced 228 damaged houses. A man died in La Huerta when he fell from his roof checking damages from Hernan, and a woman in Cabo Corrientes suffered burns on her arms and legs due to an oven fire, presumably from a short circuit during the storm.

The Jalisco State Emergency Committee declared states of emergency in the municipalities of Tomatlán, Casimiro Castillo, Cihuatlán, La Huerta, Villa Purificación, Cabo Corrientes and Cuautitlán de García Barragán after the passage of the cyclone. Help from both the federal government's National Fund for Natural Disasters (FONDEN) and Jalisco's State Fund for Natural Disasters (FOEDEN) was given to the 7 aforementioned municipalities. Food pantries, mats, hygiene kits, and liters of water were among the supplies given to the residents of 1,674 damaged homes.

Colima
The port city of Manzanillo in Colima saw great impacts from Tropical Storm Hernan. Numerous overflowing rivers caused severe inundation and widespread flooding. Hundreds of homes, businesses, and streets were covered in mud, and several roads collapsed or were impassable immediately following. Manzanillo's president of the Planning and Tourism Commission, Luis Rogelio Salinas Sánchez, stated large numbers of urban, suburban, and rural areas around Manzanillo suffered serious damage. According to Sánchez, torrential rain, rip currents, sand, and debris were stirred up throughout Manzanillo as Hernan passed offshore. Sánchez stated that the losses in Manzanillo were "unquantifiable", and Civil Protection authorities carried out damage assessments, in order to demand that an emergency declaration be signed by the state's government. In addition, damage was reported to Colima's coastal areas and roadways, and structures along the coast saw serious damage as roofs collapsed and flood waters swept away cars and battered buildings. 30 people were also evacuated in high-risk areas of Manzanillo.

Guerrero
Destructive rains from Hernan and its precursor spread into Guerrero in conjunction with the Intertropical Convergence Zone (ITCZ) for several days in late August, causing at least  of rainfall along the coastline of the state. Guerrero's governor, Héctor Astudillo Flores, called an extraordinary session of the State Committee for Civil Protection to address damage caused by Hernan. One person was reported missing in the state from the town of Hacienda de Cabañas following the floods and mudslides brought on by the storm. The government of Guerrero obtained emergency and disaster declarations for a total of 43 municipalities in the state, which experienced heavy rains and flooding from Hernan and its precursor from August 24 through August 27. The declarations allowed the affected municipalities to access resources from FONDEN. A total of 211 people were evacuated to six shelters.

The large port city of Acapulco experienced heavy rains, falling trees, and severe landslides due to Hernan and the ITCZ. A young man in the municipality of Cacalutla had to be rescued after being dragged into a river. Severe damage was reported along Cayaquitos beach, where garbage and animal corpses washed up on coastal beaches. Winds gusts and torrential rainfall tore the roofs off of businesses, and tourism was affected due to the trash and debris Hernan stirred up along the beach of the city. Secretariat Ojeda Durán sent military personnel to Guerrero and neighboring Oaxaca. In the municipality of Juxtlahuaca, located on the border of Guerrero and Oaxaca, the Mixteco River overflowed its banks, inundating homes nearby.

Elsewhere
In the state of Michoacán, where disruptions and flash flooding were reported as well, up to 600,000 sea turtle eggs in Ixtapilla Marine Turtle Sanctuary were swept away or destroyed by Hernan, including those of the threatened Olive Ridley turtle, making for a large environmental loss. The state of Sinaloa reported "intense punctual rains", and flooding, hail, minor mudslides, and debris were reported in the south of the state. The city of Mazatlan closed its port and beaches on August 28 due to hostile conditions from Hernan. Nayarit reported floods in the cities of Bahía de Banderas and San Blas, and rainfall in the state exceeded .

Although Hernan weakened to a remnant low prior to crossing Baja California Sur, the National Meteorological Service (SMN) warned residents to take "extreme precautions", due to the severe impact in other western states. Minor rainfall, gusty winds, and large waves spread across the coast of the Peninsula even as Hernan weakened and dissipated.

See also

 Weather of 2020
 Tropical cyclones in 2020
 List of Eastern Pacific tropical storms
 Other storms named Hernan
 Tropical Storm Ileana (2018) - Passed just offshore southwest Mexico and brought similar effects.
 Tropical Storm Vicente (2018) - Caused deadly mudslides and similar rainfall and mud-related effects in southern Mexico
 Tropical Storm Narda (2019) - Made landfall on and affected similar western Mexican states.

References

External links
 The National Hurricane Center's advisory archive on Tropical Storm Hernan

Eastern Pacific tropical storms
2020 Pacific hurricane season
2020 in Mexico
Hernan